Doclisboa is a documentary film festival in Lisbon, Portugal which held its first edition in 2002.

In 2020, Doclisboa was organized into six moments of programme across six months, in order to deal with the pandemic restrictions while presenting its physical screenings in Lisbon's main venues.

In 2021, the festival returned to its original, with a 11-day live format.

The 19th edition took place between 21 an 31 October, with its original sections, featuring a total of 249 films. The winner of Best Film Award (International Competition) was 918 Nights, by Spanish director Arantza Santesteban.

In 2022, the festival's 20th edition will be held from 6 to 16 October, welcoming films from all over the world, with its competitive and non-competitive sections: the International Competition, National Competition, New Visions, From the Earth to the Moon, Heart Beat, Retrospectives, Cinema of Urgency, Green Years and Doc Alliance.

Call for entries are open until May 31, 2022.

Doclisboa is part of the Doc Alliance – a creative partnership between 7 key European documentary film festivals.

Awards

Best Film (International Competition)

References

External links

Documentary film festivals in Portugal
Festivals in Lisbon
Annual events in Lisbon